Deh-e Mir Jafar Khan (also Romanized as Deh-e Mīr Ja‘far Khān) is a village in Jahanabad Rural District, in the Central District of Hirmand County, Sistan and Baluchestan Province, Iran. At the 2006 census, its population was 1,107, in 233 families.

References 

Populated places in Hirmand County